Davaademberel Nomin-Erdene (born 15 February 2000) is a Mongolian chess player and one of the Mongolian leading players in modern history. A chess prodigy, she is the Mongolian chess player who became the first-ever World Youth Chess Champion and Asian Youth Champion. She won the World Youth Chess Championships in her age and gender category. She holds three Grandmaster (GM) norms, and she is The youngest Mongolian chess player who earned FIDE titles Woman Grandmaster title age of 14th. Also earned the International Master title age of 15th. Nomin-Erdene has a peak FIDE rating of 2490 and has been ranked as high as No. 18 in the world among women. She has represented Mongolian women chess team at the Chess Olympiad and Asian Nations Chess Cup.

Chess career
She won the Girls Under-10 section of the 2010 World Youth Chess Championship at Porto Carras. Also, she got a gold medal from Asian Youth Chess Championship in 2010 Beijing, Girls under-10.  As a result, she earned the title of Woman FIDE Master (WFM). On 5 January 2015, she earned her third Woman Grandmaster (WGM) norm age of 14y10m. In September 2015 she got International Master (IM) title age of 15. She won several open tournaments. One of the best victories was FE 36 Edoardo Crespi open (2015) Milan Italy. Now she holds three Grandmaster (GM) norms. Nomin-Erdene has a peak FIDE rating of 2490 and has been ranked as high as No. 18 in the world among women. She is the only Mongolian woman chess player to be ranked in the top 20 Women players list.

National representation
Nomin-Erdene has played for team Mongolia in the Women's Chess Olympiad, and Asian Nations Chess Cup. She got her first Grandmaster norm from the Hotel Sajam GM event in Novi Sad in February 2016, scoring 7/9.

Personal life
Nomin-Erdene began playing chess at the age of 5, only three months later she won her first chess trophy. When she was six years old, she got her first medal from international tournament in 2006 Ulan-Ude (Russia). Nomin-Erdene was awarded Mongolian best child of the year, Ambassador of young talent, Medal of Chinggis,  The best cup of a young prodigy among sportsmen of the year after she became the first-ever World Youth Chess Champion, and Asian Youth Chess Champion in 2010.

Nomin-Erdene was one of the most successful and popular young athletes in Mongolia from a very young age, award-winning national medals hold national records, and the War of the mind game documentary film by Namuun Zet studio is based on Nomin-Erdene and her Family's life. The documentary film "War of the mind game" was awarded the Academy Awards-2012, and is considered one of the most inspiring documentary films in Mongolia showing young talent's lifestyles.

Currently, she lives in Hungary. Since 2013 her family moved to Europe.

References

External links

Page on chess-db.com
Page on chessbase.com
Page on Chess.com
Page on 2700chess.com

2000 births
Living people
Chess International Masters
Chess woman grandmasters
Mongolian female chess players
World Youth Chess Champions